The International Motor Contest Association (IMCA) was organized in 1915 by J. Alex Sloan, and is currently the oldest active auto racing sanctioning body in the United States. IMCA is currently headquartered in Vinton, Iowa, and features several classes and divisions of weekly racing in six geographical regions of the United States.

Classes of cars sectioned by the IMCA 

 IMCA Modified – Modified race cars with open wheels in the front and closed wheels in the back
 IMCA Latemodel – full-bodied late model race cars
 IMCA RaceSaver Sprint Car – traditional 305 non-winged and winged sprint cars
 IMCA Stock Car – full-bodied production stock cars
 IMCA Hobby Stock – 8-cylinder rear wheel drive entry-level division
 IMCA Northern Sport Modified – same as modifieds but with smaller engines and more restrictive rules
 IMCA Southern Sport Modified – Similar to Modified but with full GM Metric Frame
 IMCA Sport Compact – 4-cylinder front wheel drive stock cars

Major races
The IMCA championships are held annually at the IMCA Super Nationals at Boone Speedway in Boone, Iowa. Another major race is the Harris Clash held at the Deer Creek Speedway in Spring Valley, Minnesota which was developed as a race with somewhat of an emphasis on chassis manufacturers. The IMCA Super Nationals is the biggest event held by IMCA. It happens once a year during the first week of September. This event has the most IMCA drivers in one event.

History 
The 1963 and 1964 IMCA champion, Dick Hutcherson, was not eligible for the 1965 NASCAR Grand National Series Rookie of the Year, which he won nine times and finished second in the standings; it was given to Sam McQuagg.  NASCAR's rookie standards have since changed to being based only on the NASCAR Cup Series.

In 1979, IMCA held its first IMCA Modified race at the Benton County, Iowa Speedway.

Images

References

International Motor Contest Association

External links

Official IMCA website
Official IMCA.TV Live Broadcast website
Riivet - The Official Platform for IMCA Live Broadcast Website

Auto racing organizations in the United States
Stock car racing